Henley Brook Bus Station is a Transperth bus station located on the corner of Henley Street and Starflower Road, in Henley Brook, Perth, Western Australia. It has six stands (five stands in use) served by six regular Transperth routes operated by Swan Transit.

History
Henley Brook Bus Station was first mentioned as part of a proposal in November 2016 by the Barnett Liberal-National government to construct a bus rapid transit route to Ellenbrook. The following year in March 2017, the incoming Labor government modified the specifications of the BRT project to instead be constructed as a dual carriageway road to be able to handle more traffic and also make provision for the future Morley–Ellenbrook railway line which will be constructed as part of the Metronet project.

Henley Brook Bus Station opened on 3 November 2019, following the completion of the New Lord Street project.

Bus routes
There are currently 6 regular bus routes servicing the station, 3 of which terminate here.

Gallery

References

Bus stations in Perth, Western Australia